Laurence F. Nestor (on ASCAP, he spells his first name Laurance)(born January 29, 1940) is a singer, songwriter, author from River Grove Illinois. Nestor is a member of the American Federation of Musicians and the American Society of Composers, Authors, and Publishers.

Career as musician
Nestor played keyboards for a short time for The Buckinghams in the early years after the original keyboard player, Dennis Miccolis, left shortly after the Chess Studio recording sessions of Kind of a Drag. Nestor was eventually replaced by Marty Grebb before The Buckinghams hit the charts with Don't You Care, Susan and Hey Baby.

Songwriting
Nestor's songwriting career started in 1962 while still in high school.
He was a staff songwriter at Chicago label One-derful Records.

Nestor wrote the song "Loving on Borrowed Time" on Wise World Records for Phil Orsi & The Little Kings in 1963

Career as author
Nestor is also the author and collaborator on several children's books and novels.

References

External links
Discogs |https://www.discogs.com/artist/377689-Larry-Nestor
https://www.pioneerdrama.com/authordetail.asp?ac=NESTORLARR
https://www.hitplays.com/default.aspx?pg=ab&afn=Larry&aln=Nestor

20th-century American musicians
1940 births
Living people